Gopi Warrier is a practitioner of Indian Ayurvedic medicine, a playwright, and a poet.

Life and career 

Gopi Warrier is the son of Govind Parameswara Warrier (G.P. Warrier), chairman of Indian National Railways and Principal Secretary to the Government of India. His grandfather was M.R. Krishna Warrier, a poet in Kerala. Warrier studied English Literature in India; he then took an MBA at the London Business School, studying also at the French Business School (Ecole des Hautes Etudes Commerciales) near Paris, and at the New York University Graduate School.

Ayurvedic Charitable Hospital

In 2000, Warrier founded The Ayurvedic Charitable Hospital, with 30 beds, in London. Warrier criticised the commercial aspect of Ayurveda clinics in Western countries, claiming that they were set up to trick people out of their money.  In 2006, the hospital received a court order to wind up their activities due to insolvency, and the company was dissolved in 2012.

Ayurvedic university

In 2004, Warrier, David McAlpine and Lady Sarah Morritt (trustees of the Ayurvedic Charitable Hospital) founded Mayur, the "Ayurvedic University of Europe", in London; it offers a B.Sc. degree in Ayurveda.

Ayurvedic restaurant

Warrier opened an “Ayurvedic restaurant” named Mantra in 2004 in the City of London. Rather than diners selecting dishes from a menu, the waiter would assess them and decide what food would be appropriate for them. The restaurant abandoned this approach the following year.

Plays and poems 

Warrier is the author of three books of poems, Varaha, and Lament of JC. and  "Tenth Incarnation".

Warrier has staged several plays in London and Mumbai: God Sports, The Tenth Incarnation, Genesis of Karma -Three Faces of Evil, Siddhivinayak Saves Mumbai from Terror Attack. "Ego of the Yogis - Searching for Spirituality in a Contaminated World"  and "A Polyester Lordship" in London at the Steiner Theatre.

Bibliography

Ayurvedic medicine 

 Gopi Warrier. Ayurveda: The Right Way to Live - The Ancient Indian Medical System, Focusing on the Prevention of Disease Through Diet, Lifestyle and Herbalism. Carlton Books, 2002. 
 Karen Sullivan, Harish L. Verma, Gopi Warrier. Secrets of Ayurveda. Dorling Kindersley, 2001. 
 Gopi Warrier and Deepika Gunawant. The Complete Illustrated Guide to Ayurveda: the Ancient Indian Healing Tradition. Barnes & Noble, 1997.

Poetry 

 Gopi Warrier and Amanda Brett. Lament of JC: Poems by Gopi Warrier. Delhi London Poetry Foundation, 1999.  
 Gopi Warrier. Vahara: The Secret of Evolution - New and Selected Poems. Mayur University, 2009. 
 Gopi Warrier. Karma is a Slow Virus. McAlpine & Hutton-Williams, London, 1988. 
 Gopi Warrier. In a Country near Zimbabwe: Indian socialites, Interviewing a Brahmin. McAlpine Hutton-Williams, London, 1980. ISBN
 Gopi Warrier Tenth Incarnation - Destruction and Transformation of the Existing World Order.  Delhi London Poetry Foundation 2013.

References

External links 

 Cara Ward | Gopi Warrier The Karma of Love, 2011.
 Mayur University
 Theatre of the Vedas

Living people
Year of birth missing (living people)
Ayurvedacharyas
Indian dramatists and playwrights
Indian poets